Kathryn "Katie" Mullan (born 7 April 1994) is an Ireland women's field hockey international player from Coleraine, Northern Ireland. She was captain of the Ireland team that played in the 2018 Women's Hockey World Cup final. Mullan has also won Irish Senior Cup and Women's Irish Hockey League titles with UCD. Mullan has also played camogie for CLG Eoghan Rua and helped them win the 2010 All-Ireland Intermediate Club Camogie championship.

Early years and education 
Mullan is originally from Coleraine, County Londonderry, Northern Ireland. She has four siblings - two older brothers, Bernard and Aidan, and two younger sisters, Brega and Olivia. She attended Dalriada School in Ballymoney. Mullan completed a BSc in Engineering Science in 2017, and her Master's degree (ME) in Biomedical Engineering  in 2018 at University College Dublin.

Camogie
Mullan played camogie for CLG Eoghan Rua. She was a member of the Eoghan Rua team that won the 2010 All-Ireland Intermediate Club Camogie championship. She came on as a substitute in the semi-final against Lismore and scored the winning goal in a closely contested match. She also came on as a substitute in the final, a 3–8 to 2–3 win over Laois Harps. In 2013 Mullan scored two goals in the Derry Senior Camogie Championship final victory against Slaughtneil. She also scored 1–1 in the Ulster Senior Club Camogie Championship final against Rossa. Eoghan Rua retained the Derry Senior Camogie Championship title in 2014 and Mullan scored 1–4 in the final win over Slaughtneil.

Field hockey

Early years
Mullan began playing women's field hockey at Dalriada School where her PE teacher and hockey coach was Bridget McKeever, a former Ireland women's field hockey international.
She also played for Ballymoney.

UCD
Mullan started playing for UCD in 2012. She was a member of the UCD teams that won the Irish Senior Cup in 2014, 2017 and 2018. She scored UCD's third goal in the 2018 final when they defeated Pegasus 4–0. Mullan was also a member of the UCD teams that won Women's Irish Hockey League titles in 2013–14, 2016–17 and 2017–18. In 2017 UCD completed a treble when they also won the EY Champions Trophy after defeating Hermes-Monkstown in a penalty shoot-out. Mullan has also played for UCD in the 2015 and 2018 EuroHockey Club Champions Cups.

Ireland international
Mullan represented Ireland at Under-17  and Under-18 levels  before making her senior debut against Wales in August 2012. Together with Roisin Upton and Emily Beatty, Mullan represented Ireland at the 2010 Youth Olympic Games.

In March 2015 Mullan was a member of the Ireland team that won a 2014–15 Women's FIH Hockey World League Round 2 tournament hosted in Dublin, defeating Canada in the final after a penalty shoot-out. She was also a member of the Ireland team that won the 2015 Women's EuroHockey Championship II, scoring in the final as they defeated the Czech Republic 5–0. In January 2017 she was also a member of the Ireland team that won a 2016–17 Women's FIH Hockey World League Round 2 tournament in Kuala Lumpur. She again scored in the final as Ireland defeated Malaysia 3–0.

Mullan took over as Ireland captain from Megan Frazer, who was kept out of the side through injuries. She remained captain throughout Ireland's 2018 Women's Hockey World Cup campaign, leading them to the silver medal. She featured in all of Ireland's games throughout the tournament, including the pool games against the United States, India, and England, the quarter-final against India, the semi-final against Spain and the final against the Netherlands.

Honours

Field hockey 
Ireland
Women's Hockey World Cup
Runners Up: 2018
Women's FIH Hockey World League
Winners: 2015 Dublin, 2017 Kuala Lumpur
Women's EuroHockey Championship II
Winners: 2015
Women's Hockey Champions Challenge I
Runners Up: 2014
Women's FIH Hockey Series
Runners Up: 2019 Banbridge
Women's Four Nations Cup
Runners Up: 2017
UCD
Women's Irish Hockey League
Winners: 2013–14, 2016–17, 2017–18
Irish Senior Cup
Winners: 2013–14, 2016–17, 2017–18
Runners Up: 2012–13
EY Champions Trophy
Winners: 2017
UCD Alumni Award in Sport 2019

Camogie 
CLG Eoghan Rua
All-Ireland Intermediate Club Camogie
Winners: 2010
Ulster Senior Club Camogie Championship
Winners: 2013
Derry Senior Camogie Championship
Winners: 2013, 2014

References

External links
 
 
 Katie Mullan at Hockey Ireland
 
 

1994 births
Living people
Place of birth missing (living people)
Derry camogie players
Sportspeople from County Londonderry
People from Coleraine, County Londonderry
People educated at Dalriada School
Alumni of University College Dublin
Female field hockey players from Northern Ireland
Irish female field hockey players
British female field hockey players
Female field hockey forwards
Ireland international women's field hockey players
UCD Ladies' Hockey Club players
Der Club an der Alster players
Field hockey players at the 2010 Summer Youth Olympics
Women's Irish Hockey League players
Expatriate sportspeople from Northern Ireland in Germany
Feldhockey Bundesliga (Women's field hockey) players
Field hockey players at the 2020 Summer Olympics
Olympic field hockey players of Ireland